The Zečeve Drage Viaduct is located between the Bosiljevo 2 and Vrbovsko interchanges of the A6 motorway in Gorski Kotar, Croatia, just to the west of the Veliki Gložac Tunnel. The viaduct consists of two parallel structures: the first one was completed in 2004, and the second one in 2008. The viaduct is tolled within the A6 motorway ticket system and there are no separate toll plazas associated with its use. The viaduct was completed by Viadukt.

Structure description
The deck of the viaduct follows a  radius concave vertical curve, and the longitudinal grade of the road carried by the viaduct ranges from 4.38% to 0.78%. The superstructure of the viaduct comprises a box cross section made from pre-stressed reinforced concrete, put in place by incremental launching due to the considerable height of the structure. The launching was carried out downhill, because of the substantial grade of the superstructure, with two VBT 19×140 cable stays as a braking mechanism for the  box girder. The cross-sections of the box girder and the piers are virtually identical to those of Bajer Bridge.

Traffic volume
Traffic volumes are regularly measured and reported by Autocesta Rijeka–Zagreb, the operator of the viaduct and A6 motorway where the structure is located, and published by Hrvatske ceste. Substantial variations between annual (AADT) and summer (ASDT) traffic volumes are attributed to the fact that the bridge carries a large amount of tourist traffic to the Adriatic resorts. The traffic count is performed using analysis of motorway toll ticket sales.

See also
List of bridges by length

References

Box girder bridges
Bridges completed in 2004
Toll bridges in Croatia
Viaducts in Croatia
Buildings and structures in Primorje-Gorski Kotar County
Transport in Primorje-Gorski Kotar County